Oleshky Sands is a desert in Ukraine. It is situated inland from the Ukrainian coast of the Black Sea and consists of sand dunes or kuchuhury (locally), which reach a height up to five meters. A sparse vegetation can be located across the sands.

Origin 
The sands are thought to be formed during the most recent ice age by aeolian processes accumulating and forming cliffs of lower parts of nearby River Dnieper. It is speculated that the amount of vegetation was reduced by herds of sheep who were introduced there by Friedrich-Jacob Eduardovych Falz-Fein who used the sands, formerly populated by weeds, as a pasture.

Geography 

The Oleshky Desert is located in Kherson Raion, Kherson Oblast, 30 km (~20 mi) east of Kherson. Before the Russian annexation of the Crimean Khanate at the end of the 18th century, the territory belonged to the nomad Nogai Hordes, particularly the Djambuilut Horde. No detailed historical information about the region has survived.

The closest populated settlement is seven kilometers away (~4.5 mi). In Soviet times the sands were used as an Air Force bombing range for pilots of the Warsaw Pact alliance. To this day there is a possibility of finding some unexploded ordnance.

Environment 
Due to its temperature and the amount of precipitation these sands sometimes are qualified as a semi-desert. Oleshky Sands are 15 km across (~10 mi) and they are surrounded by a very dense forest planted to prevent dunes moving. Due to its density, the forest often catches fire. Although a relatively small sandy steppe, the Oleshky Sands have sandstorms. They occur due to the type of the sand in the area as it is very fine and is easily picked up by a wind. The intensity of the sandstorms is rather weak. In the Oleshky sands at the depth of 30–40 m (~100 ft) there is an underground lake, which forms an essential part of the local environment.

See also 
 Askania-Nova
 Cumania
 Deliblato Sands
 Oleshky Sands National Nature Park

References

External links 

 Oleshky Sands overview — Seven Wonders of Ukraine. 
 Video footage of the desert, a video footage of the desert is provided by a blog-site of the local adventurers to familiarize the world with Ukraine.
 Desert, an excellent blog-site of Anna Stepankova with plenty of pictures and explanations. The problem might be with a language barrier as the site is in Russian, but the amount of pictures presented defeats that issue.
 Odessa Club of the extreme automobile touring, all pictures with vehicles driving across country areas.
 Oleshky Sands (Алешковские пески), more pictures of sand dunes.
 Three days through a forest, two - across fields  a travel story through the Oleshky Sands with pictures.
 Singing Sands by Vladimir Chivilikhin , a reflection story about the desert. Interviews with local scientists, historical research, other.
 An informational site about underground waters in the area 
 

Geography of Kherson Oblast
Landforms of Ukraine
Deserts
Deserts of Europe
Dunes of Europe
Deserts of Ukraine